Maxillaria parkeri is a species of orchid native to tropical South America.

References

External links 

parkeri
Orchids of South America